The Train Has Stopped is a 1982 Soviet drama film directed by Vadim Abdrashitov and written by Aleksandr Mindadze. The last film role of Anatoly Solonitsyn.

Before the official premiere the film was shown in spring of 1982 at the Concert Hall of the Moscow Institute of Physics and Technology.

Plot 
Late at night, a train accident happens. Four empty lorries suddenly roll down a slope and crash into a passenger train on high velocity. Only driver Timonin's courage, who until recently remained in the cabin of the locomotive and applied the emergency brake, helped to avoid a colossal calamity. However, the driver himself has died.

The tragedy is investigated by the detective German Ermakov. In his hotel room Ermakov meets with journalist Igor Malinin, one of the passengers of the ill-fated train. The subject of their conversation, of course, becomes the wreck. Malinin writes an enthusiastic article about the heroism of the driver Timonin but Ermakov, who compiles more and more information, understands that it's not so simple as it seems.

The immediate cause of the disaster becomes a chain of seemingly "minor" violations. Railroad shunter Panteleev ignores instructions and does not put in a second boot, causing the lorries to break away from their parked positions and to roll out toward the passenger train. Head of the depot, Golovanov does not observe protocol and releases a locomotive on the rails with a faulty speed gauge. And the dead driver Timonin absolutely had no right to start his run, without fixing the speed meter.

Investigator Ermakov formulates the results of his investigation in a very firm way: there was no heroism, and instead there was a large-scale carelessness that led to the death of a person. But this causes indignation and outright hatred directed towards Ermakov from the public and the leadership of the city, where Timonin lived. Even the journalist Malinin, initially experiencing sympathy to the investigator is indignant towards the behavior of Ermakov.  Let this be an act of bravery!  — uttering this, the journalist takes the side of the majority.

Cast 
 Oleg Borisov as German Ivanovich Ermakov, investigator
 Anatoly Solonitsyn as Igor Malinin, journalist
 Mikhail Gluzsky as Pyotr  Filippovich Panteleev, railroad coupler
 Nina Ruslanova  as Maria Ignatyevna, head of administration
 Lyudmila Zaytseva as Timonina, locomotive driver’s widow
 Nikolay Skorobogatov as Pavel Sergeyevich Golovanov, head of Custody
 Pyotr Kolbasin as Valery Gubkin, driver’s assistant
 Stanislav Korenev as Deputy Head of Administration
 Aleksandr Pashutin as a train passenger
 Eldar Ryazanov as a train passenger (uncredited)

Awards 
 1984  —  Vasilyev Brothers State Prize of the RSFSR:
 Vadim Abdrashitov
 Oleg Borisov
 Aleksandr Mindadze
 Yuri Nevsky
 Alexander Tolkachyov
 1984 — IFF author's film in San Remo, special jury prize for best screenplay (Aleksandr  Mindadze)

References

External links
 

Films directed by Vadim Abdrashitov
Films scored by Eduard Artemyev
Rail transport films
Soviet drama films
Mosfilm films
1982 drama films
1982 films